Sass, Saß or SASS may refer to:

SASS
 M110 Semi-Automatic Sniper System (or M110 SASS)
 Safe Amplification Site Society, a non-profit organization that promotes music and the arts within Vancouver, British Columbia, Canada 
 Shanghai Academy of Social Sciences
 Single Action Shooting Society, a sanctioning organisation for cowboy action shooting
 Society for the Advancement of Scandinavian Study
 South African Secret Service
 the secondary school of Saint Andrew's School, Singapore
 Sabarimala Ayyappa Seva Samajam, a non-profit organisation and an affiliate of Sangh Parivar

As a name or nickname
 Sass (surname)
 Cassandra Freedman, a fictional character nicknamed "Sass" from the Australian soap opera Neighbours
 Sara Sass Jordan (born 1962), Canadian singer
 Sass Henno (born 1982), Estonian writer

Other uses
 Sass, a slang term for 3,4-methylenedioxyamphetamine (MDA)
 Sass (stylesheet language), Syntactically Awesome Style Sheets
 Sass music, a subgenre of hardcore punk and screamo

See also
 Sass and Bide, Australian fashion label
 SASS-C, the Surveillance Analysis Support System for ATC-Centre
 Sasse (disambiguation)
 Sassy (disambiguation)
 Saas (disambiguation)
 SAS (disambiguation)